In Greek mythology, Deucalion or Deukalion (/dju:keɪli:ən/; Ancient Greek: Δευκαλίων) was the name of the following characters:

 Deucalion, son of Prometheus, survivor of the Deucalian flood.
Deucalion, son of Zeus and Iodame, daughter of Itonus. He was the brother of Thebe who became the wife of Ogygus.
Deucalion, son of Minos and Pasiphae, and apparently succeeded his older brother Catreus as King of Crete, father of Idomeneus.
 Deucalion, a soldier Achilles kills in the Iliad to avenge the death of Patroclus.
 Deucalion, another name of Asterius, came from Pella to join the Argonauts. He was the son of Hypso and probably, Hyperasius. In some accounts, his father was called Hippasus.

Notes

References 

 Apollodorus, The Library with an English Translation by Sir James George Frazer, F.B.A., F.R.S. in 2 Volumes, Cambridge, MA, Harvard University Press; London, William Heinemann Ltd. 1921. . Online version at the Perseus Digital Library. Greek text available from the same website.
Apollonius Rhodius, Argonautica translated by Robert Cooper Seaton (1853-1915), R. C. Loeb Classical Library Volume 001. London, William Heinemann Ltd, 1912. Online version at the Topos Text Project.
 Apollonius Rhodius, Argonautica. George W. Mooney. London. Longmans, Green. 1912. Greek text available at the Perseus Digital Library.
 Gaius Julius Hyginus, Fabulae from The Myths of Hyginus translated and edited by Mary Grant. University of Kansas Publications in Humanistic Studies. Online version at the Topos Text Project.
 Gaius Valerius Flaccus, Argonautica translated by Mozley, J H. Loeb Classical Library Volume 286. Cambridge, MA, Harvard University Press; London, William Heinemann Ltd. 1928. Online version at theio.com.
 Gaius Valerius Flaccus, Argonauticon. Otto Kramer. Leipzig. Teubner. 1913. Latin text available at the Perseus Digital Library.
 Homer, The Iliad with an English Translation by A.T. Murray, Ph.D. in two volumes. Cambridge, MA., Harvard University Press; London, William Heinemann, Ltd. 1924. . Online version at the Perseus Digital Library.
 Homer, Homeri Opera in five volumes. Oxford, Oxford University Press. 1920. . Greek text available at the Perseus Digital Library.

Children of Zeus
Demigods in classical mythology
Characters in the Iliad